Antyodaya Express are series of trains operated by Indian Railways. The word Antyodaya refers to the uplifting of the weakest section of the society. These series of trains are initially supposed to be overnight fully unreserved trains but later on converted into typical overnight express train with reservation system. Antyodaya Express was proposed in 2016 Railway budget of India to operate on peak routes having more rush. coaches are designed by Indian Railways with state-of-the-art bio-toilets and facility for mobile charging in compartments as well. 
During the initial period, these trains had only general/unreserved coaches but later on reservation system is gradually introduced with reserved coaches and thus turned into typical overnight train with few unreserved coaches in front and back. The first generation of this series is jan sadharan express. Some of the jan sadharan trains are converted to antyodya express trains.

Facilities and new features

 Charging ports for charging electronic devices such as mobile phones, laptops, etc.
 Bio-toilets in compartments
 The exterior of coaches have a futuristic look with the use of vinyl sheets
 Safety measures in compartments such as the introduction of smoke alarms and CCTV cameras
 Aquaguard water vending machines, coat hangers, and Braille Indicators present.

First services

The first service of Antyodaya Express was started on 27 Feb 2017, between Ernakulam Junction and Howrah inaugurated by Suresh Prabhu, the former Minister for Railways.

Active Services

Defunct Services
The following services were defunct Antyodya Express Train services

See also

References